Petar Divić (born 11 July 1975) is a Serbian former professional footballer who played as a striker.

Club career
Divić played for Dinamo Pančevo in the 1994–95 Second League of FR Yugoslavia, as the club suffered relegation. He spent one season with the club in the Serbian League Vojvodina, before securing a transfer to Spanish club Toledo in the summer of 1996. On his league debut, Divić netted a hat-trick in a 4–0 home win over Écija. He, however, managed to score just one more goal in the remainder of the 1996–97 Segunda División.

In the summer of 1997, Divić returned to his homeland and joined First League of FR Yugoslavia club Rad. He failed to make an impact with the Građevinari and switched to ČSK Čelarevo in the 1998 winter transfer window, immediately helping them win promotion to the Second League.

In the summer of 1999, Divić signed with OFK Beograd. He enjoyed a successful stint with the club, becoming the First League of FR Yugoslavia top scorer in the 2000–01 campaign with 27 goals. During his two and a half years with the Romantičari, Divić scored a total of 56 league goals in 76 appearances.

In December 2001, Divić moved abroad for the second time and joined Union Berlin. He scored seven times in 18 league games until the end of the 2001–02 season. Six months later, Divić was transferred to fellow Zweite Bundesliga club Eintracht Trier. He failed to score any goals in 15 league appearances.

International career
Divić earned two caps for FR Yugoslavia, both at the Kirin Cup in 2001. He initially came on as a half-time substitute for Milivoje Ćirković in a 0–2 loss to Paraguay on 28 June. Six days later, on 4 July, Divić played the full 90 minutes in Dragan Stojković's national team farewell against Japan, as they lost 0–1.

Post-playing career
After serving as a caretaker in the final rounds of the 2016–17 Serbian First League, Divić was appointed manager of OFK Beograd in June 2017, following the club's relegation to the Serbian League Belgrade. He resigned from the position in April 2018. Later that month, Divić took charge at his hometown club Dinamo 1945.

Career statistics

Honours

Club
ČSK Čelarevo
 Serbian League Vojvodina: 1997–98

Individual
 First League of FR Yugoslavia Top Scorer: 2000–01

References

External links

 
 
 
 

1. FC Union Berlin players
2. Bundesliga players
Association football forwards
CD Toledo players
Expatriate footballers in Germany
Expatriate footballers in Hungary
Expatriate footballers in Spain
First League of Serbia and Montenegro players
FK ČSK Čelarevo players
FK Dinamo Pančevo players
FK Rad players
FK Smederevo players
Nemzeti Bajnokság I players
OFK Beograd managers
OFK Beograd players
Segunda División players
Serbia and Montenegro expatriate footballers
Serbia and Montenegro expatriate sportspeople in Germany
Serbia and Montenegro expatriate sportspeople in Spain
Serbia and Montenegro footballers
Serbia and Montenegro international footballers
Serbian expatriate footballers
Serbian expatriate sportspeople in Hungary
Serbian football managers
Serbian footballers
Sportspeople from Pančevo
SV Eintracht Trier 05 players
Vasas SC players
1975 births
Living people